The 1973 Ottawa Rough Riders finished the season in 1st place in the Eastern Conference with a 9–5 record and won the Grey Cup.

Preseason

Regular season

Standings

Schedule

Postseason

Playoffs

Grey Cup
Edmonton quarterback Tom Wilkinson was accused of using an unnatural head motion to draw the defence offside. Ottawa General Manager Frank Clair lobbied league officials to watch Wilkinson carefully at the line of scrimmage.

Player stats

Passing

Rushing

Awards and honours
CFL's Most Outstanding Canadian Award – Gerry Organ (K)
CFL's Coach of the Year – Jack Gotta
Grey Cup Most Valuable Player, Charlie Brandon (DE)
Dick Adams, Defensive Back, CFL All-Star
Jerry Campbell, Linebacker, CFL All-Star
Al Marcelin, Defensive Back, CFL All-Star
Rudy Sims, Defensive Tackle, CFL All-Star

References

Ottawa Rough Riders seasons
James S. Dixon Trophy championship seasons
Grey Cup championship seasons
Ottawa Rough Riders
1973 Canadian Football League season by team